HMS Weymouth was a 50-gun fourth rate ship of the line of the Royal Navy, launched at Portsmouth Dockyard on 8 August 1693.

She was rebuilt at Woolwich Dockyard according to the 1706 Establishment, relaunching on 26 February 1719. Weymouth continued to serve until 1732, when she was broken up.

Notes

References

Lavery, Brian (2003) The Ship of the Line - Volume 1: The development of the battlefleet 1650-1850. Conway Maritime Press. .

Ships of the line of the Royal Navy
1690s ships